This is a list of notable directors in motion picture and television arts.

A

Dodo Abashidze
George Abbott
Norman Abbott
Phil Abraham
Jim Abrahams
Abiola Abrams
J. J. Abrams
Ivan Abramson
Lenny Abrahamson
Hany Abu-Assad
Tengiz Abuladze
Herbert Achternbusch
Andy Ackerman
Andrew Adamson
Anita W. Addison
Maren Ade
Carine Adler
Percy Adlon
John G. Adolfi
Franklin Adreon
Ben Affleck
Casey Affleck
Neil Affleck
Andrew Agnew
Alejandro Agresti
Joe Ahearne
Caroline Aherne
Abdel Rahim Ahmed
Aqeel Ahmed
Alexandre Aja
Chantal Akerman
Desiree Akhavan
Fatih Akın
Moustapha Akkad
John Akomfrah
R. Kan Albay
Barbara Albert
Félix Enríquez Alcalá
Alan Alda
Robert Aldrich
Tomás Gutiérrez Alea
Grigori Aleksandrov
Victoria Aleksanyan
Chris Alexander
David Alexander
Jason Alexander
John Alexander
Sherman Alexie
Ozzie Alfonso
Khalik Allah
Marc Allégret
Yves Allégret
Elizabeth Allen
Irwin Allen
Lewis Allen
Woody Allen
Hassan Al-Imam
Syed Ali Raza Usama
Mairzee Almas
Pedro Almodóvar
Paul Almond
Robert Altman
Fede Álvarez
Silvio Amadio
Mathieu Amalric
Rod Amateau
Ned Ambler
Gianni Amelio
Alejandro Amenábar
Jon Amiel
Ana Lily Amirpour
George Amponsah
Dev Anand
Sean Anders
Thom Andersen
Bob Anderson
Brad Anderson
Broncho Billy Anderson
Deborah Anderson
Gordon Anderson
Justin Anderson
Lindsay Anderson
Michael Anderson
Mitch Anderson
Paul Thomas Anderson
Paul W. S. Anderson
Trevor Anderson
Wes Anderson
Roy Andersson
Metodi Andonov
Raoul André
Bryan Andrews
Kostas Andritsos
Theo Angelopoulos
Kenneth Anger
Threes Anna
Graham Annable
Ken Annakin
Jean-Jacques Annaud
Hideaki Anno
Arnold Antonin
Michelangelo Antonioni
Pan Anzi
Judd Apatow
Emmanuel Apea
Oscar Apfel
Norman Apstein
Michael Apted
Gregg Araki
Alfonso Aráu
Roscoe Arbuckle
Denys Arcand
George Archainbaud
Wes Archer
Jane Arden
Emile Ardolino
Asia Argento
Dario Argento
Adam Arkin
Allan Arkush
Serena Armitage
Dionciel Armstrong
Gillian Armstrong
Andrea Arnold
Jack Arnold
Darren Aronofsky
Fernando Arrabal
Miguel Arteta
Larysa Artiugina
Dorothy Arzner
Dinara Asanova
Hal Ashby
John Mallory Asher
Anthony Asquith
Olivier Assayas
Ari Aster
Carlos Atanes
Richard Attenborough
Dan Attias
David Attwood
Jacques Audiard
Jacqueline Audry
John H. Auer
Bille August
Claude Autant-Lara
Aram Avakian
Roger Avary
Pupi Avati
Hy Averback
Ilya Averbakh
Tex Avery
John G. Avildsen
Jon Avnet
David Ayer
Dan Aykroyd
Richard Ayoade
Nabil Ayouch
Mary Ayubi

Top of page

B

Ba–Bh

Jamie Babbit
Héctor Babenco
Lloyd Bacon
Clarence G. Badger
John Badham
Bae Yong-Kyun
Cindy Baer
Prince Bagdasarian
King Baggot
Nadeem Baig
Prano Bailey-Bond
Stuart Baird
Imruh Bakari
Roy Ward Baker
Sean Baker
Mohammad Bakri
Ralph Bakshi
Bob Balaban
Aleksei Balabanov
Kailasam Balachander
Jan Balej
Peter Baldwin
Carroll Ballard
Anne Bancroft
Albert Band
Charles Band
Biyi Bandele
Elizabeth Banks
Monty Banks
Joseph Barbera
Juan Antonio Bardem
Richard L. Bare
Chris Barfoot
Francesco Barilli
Sooraj R. Barjatya
Clive Barker
Reginald Barker
Tom Barman
Boris Barnet
Matthew Barney
Daniel Barnz
Allen Baron
David Barrett
Chuck Barris
Robert V. Barron
Christopher Barry
Drew Barrymore
Morris Barry
Lionel Barrymore
Andrzej Bartkowiak
Jules Bass
M. J. Bassett
Joy Batchelor
Jason Bateman
Otto Bathurst
Paul Bartel
Hall Bartlett
Charles Barton
Felix Basch
Aclan Bates
Jay Bauman
Noah Baumbach
Lamberto Bava
Mario Bava
Michael Bay
Samuel Bayer
Juan Antonio Bayona
Edward Bazalgette
Luigi Bazzoni
Warren Beatty
William Beaudine
Harry Beaumont
Harold Becker
Jacques Becker
Josh Becker
Terry Becker
Wolfgang Becker
Guy Norman Bee
Ford Beebe
Greg Beeman
Morgan Beggs
Hans Behrendt
Jean-Jacques Beineix
Timur Bekmambetov
Susan Belbin
Monta Bell
Earl Bellamy
Troian Bellisario
Marco Bellocchio
Jerry Belson
Maria Luisa Bemberg
Steve Bendelack
Jack Bender
László Benedek
Shyam Benegal
Lubomír Beneš
Roberto Benigni
David Benioff
Richard Benjamin
Rodney Bennett
Spencer Gordon Bennet
Robert Benton
Luca Bercovici
Bruce Beresford
Alec Berg
Peter Berg
Andrew Bergman
Ingmar Bergman
Busby Berkeley
Luis Garcia Berlanga
Greg Berlanti
Abby Berlin
Marc Berlin
Robert Berlinger
Andrea Berloff
Paul Bern
Ishmael Bernal
Paul Bernard
Curtis Bernhardt
Adam Bernstein
Claude Berri
Halle Berry
John Berry
Arthur Berthelet
André Berthomieu
Bryan Bertino
Bernardo Bertolucci
Luc Besson
Frank Beyer
Bharathiraja

Top of page

Bi–Bz

Dominic Bianchi
Ed Bianchi
John Biddle
Fabián Bielinsky
Kathryn Bigelow
Tony Bill
Anna Biller
Peter Billingsley
Bruce Bilson
Brad Bird
Bill Bixby
Alice Guy-Blaché
Herbert Blaché
John Black
Nicola Black
Shane Black
Farren Blackburn
Gerald Blake
George Blair
Alessandro Blasetti
Bertrand Blier
Jeffrey Blitz
Neill Blomkamp
Matt Bloom
Don Bluth
John G. Blystone
Keith Boak
James Bobin
Anna Boden and Ryan Fleck
Richard Boden
Eugeniusz Bodo
Carl Boese
Budd Boetticher
Paul Bogart
Peter Bogdanovich
José Bohr
Michel Boisrond
Patrick Bokanowski
Richard Boleslawski
Uwe Boll
Mauro Bolognini
Fyodor Bondarchuk
Sergei Bondarchuk
Bong Joon-ho
Linwood Boomer
John Boorman
Walerian Borowczyk
Frank Borzage
John and Roy Boulting
Lucien Bourjeily
David Bowers
Pearl Bowser
Muriel Box
David Boyd
Dermot Boyd
Danny Boyle
Charles Brabin
Richard Bracewell
Harry Bradbeer
Robert N. Bradbury
John Brahm
Stan Brakhage
Matt Braly
A.V. Bramble
Kenneth Branagh
Spike Brandt
Fred C. Brannon
Tinto Brass
Charles Braverman
Kevin Bray
Neil Breen
Catherine Breillat
Herbert Brenon
Will Brenton
Robert Bresson
Martin Brest
Vinko Brešan
Howard Bretherton
Eric Brevig
Craig Brewer
Frank Braxton
Michael E. Briant
Monte Brice
Patrick Brice
Sean Bridgers
James Bridges
Nicholas Briggs
Guido Brignone
Steven Brill
Philippe de Broca
Tricia Brock
Lino Brocka
Henry Bronchtein
Ronald Bronstein
Peter Brook
Albert Brooks
James L. Brooks
Mel Brooks
Richard Brooks
Nick Broomfield
Simon Bross
James Broughton
Otto Brower
Clarence Brown
Harry Joe Brown
Rowland Brown
Tod Browning
Martin Bruestle
Adrian Brunel
Nick Bruno
Chris Buck
Detlev Buck
Tom Buckingham
Marc Buckland
Norman Buckley
Colin Bucksey
Steve Buscemi
Harold S. Bucquet
Jan Bucquoy
Danny Buday
John Carl Buechler
Bradley Buecker
Luis Buñuel
Janice Burgess
Pete Burness
Charles Burnett
Bo Burnham
Edward Burns
James Burrows
Tim Burstall
Tim Burton
Alexander Butler
Brian Patrick Butler
Chris Butler
David Butler
John Butler
Robert Butler
Ray Butt
Jörg Buttgereit
Zane Buzby
Edward Buzzell
Ed Bye
James Ward Byrkit

Top of page

C

Christy Cabanne
Michael Cacoyannis
Margarita Cadenas
Israel Adrián Caetano
David Caffrey
Nicolas Cage
James Cagney
Mike Cahill
Edward L. Cahn
James Cameron
Douglas Camfield
Augusto Caminito
Donald Cammell
Joe Camp
Juan José Campanella
Colin Campbell
Jonny Campbell
Luke Campbell
Martin Campbell
Mont Campbell
Norman Campbell
Jane Campion
Antonio Campos
Danny Cannon
Dyan Cannon
Kay Cannon
Colin Cant
Graham Cantwell
Peter Capaldi
Albert Capellani
Frank Capra
Luigi Capuano
Leos Carax
Jack Cardiff
Christian Carion
Joe Carnahan
Marcel Carné
John Carney
Giuliano Carnimeo
Marc Caro
Niki Caro
Benjamin Caron
John Carpenter
Thomas Carr
Enrique Carreras
John Paddy Carstairs
Chris Carter
D. J. Caruso
Enrico Casarosa
John Cassavetes
Nick Cassavetes
P. J. Castellaneta
William Castle
Torre Catalano
Michael Caton-Jones
Peter Cattaneo
Alberto Cavalcanti
Liliana Cavani
Paolo Cavara
André Cayatte
Ralph Ceder
Jeff Celentano
Simon Cellan Jones
Mark Cendrowski
Tony Cervone
Pablo César
Nuri Bilge Ceylan
Claude Chabrol
Gurinder Chadha
Don Chaffey
Aneesh Chaganty
Youssef Chahine
Fruit Chan
Jackie Chan
Peter Chan
Charlie Chaplin
Larry Charles
Charley Chase
David Chase
Émile Chautard
Michael Chaves
Damien Chazelle
Stephen Chbosky
Jeremiah S. Chechik
Kate Cheeseman
Peter Chelsom
Kaige Chen
Pierre Chenal
Yarrow Cheney
David Cherkassky
Tom Cherones
Marc Cherry
Pierre Chevalier
Milan Cheylov
Abigail Child
Ching Siu-Tung
Stephen Chiodo
Samson Chiu
Tadeusz Chmielewski
Lisa Cholodenko
Joyce Chopra
Yash Chopra
Chor Yuen
Deborah Chow
Stephen Chow
Benjamin Christensen
Roger Christian
Christian-Jaque
Rich Christiano
Roger Christiansen
Jon M. Chu
Grigori Chukhrai
Lee Isaac Chung
Peter Chung
Věra Chytilová
Michael Cimino
Claudio Cipelletti
Souleymane Cissé
Louis C.K.
René Clair
Bob Clampett
Bob Clark
Larry Clark
Richard Clark
Alan Clarke
Shirley Clarke
S. J. Clarkson
Jack Clayton
Tom Clegg
William Clemens
Jemaine Clement
René Clément
Ron Clements
Elmer Clifton
Edward F. Cline
George Clooney
Chris Clough
Robert Clouse
Henri-Georges Clouzot
Enrico Cocozza
Jean Cocteau
Coen Brothers
Larry Cohen
Rob Cohen
Jaume Collet-Serra
Keri Collins
Lewis D. Collins
Chris Columbus
Timothy Combe
Luigi Comencini
Bill Condon
Bruce Conner
Jack Conway
Ryan Coogler
Barry Cook
Fielder Cook
Victor Cook
Josh Cooley
Hal Cooper
Merian C. Cooper
Francis Ford Coppola
Roman Coppola
Sofia Coppola
Frank Coraci
Roger Corman
Alain Corneau
Joe Cornish
Orlando Corradi
Rich Correll
Lloyd Corrigan
Raiya Corsiglia
Don Coscarelli
Brian Cosgrove
George Pan Cosmatos
Pedro Costa
Costa-Gavras
Kevin Costner
Manny Coto
T. Arthur Cottam
Alex Cox
Frank Cox
Paul Cox
William James Craft
Kelly Fremon Craig
William Crain
Bryan Cranston
Wes Craven
Joel Crawford
Peter Cregeen
Destin Daniel Cretton
Charles Crichton
Michael Crichton
Jon Cring
Donald Crisp
Armando Crispino
John Crockett
David Croft
Donald Crombie
John Cromwell
Brandon Cronenberg
David Cronenberg
Mackenzie Crook
Alan Crosland
Matthew Crouch
Cameron Crowe
John Crowley
James Cruze
Billy Crystal
Arzén von Cserépy
Alfonso Cuarón
Chris Cuddington
Michael Cudlitz
George Cukor
Jeremy Culver
Fiona Cumming
Irving Cummings
Michael Cumming
James Cunningham
Sean S. Cunningham
Adam Curtis
Dan Curtis
Jamie Lee Curtis
Richard Curtis
Michael Curtiz
 Michael Cusack
Paul Czinner

Top of page

D

Nia DaCosta
Diminas Dagogo
John Dahl
Alan Dale
Stephen Daldry
Massimo Dallamano
Rebecca Daly
Joe D'Amato
Georgi Daneliya
Rod Daniel
Frank Daniel
Greg Daniels
Lee Daniels
Stan Daniels
Vladimir Danilevich
Joe Dante
Frank Darabont
Joan Darling
Eric Darnell
Harry d'Abbadie d'Arrast
Jules Dassin
Hayato Date
Gary Dauberman
Herschel Daugherty
Byambasuren Davaa
Delmer Daves
Alki David
Hugh David
John Howard Davies
John Rhys-Davies
Terence Davies
Andrew Davis
Garth Davis
Ossie Davis
Tamra Davis
J. Searle Dawley
Roxann Dawson
Shane Dawson
Robert Day (director)
Jonathan Dayton
Drew Daywalt
Basil Dean
Basil Dearden
Tiffanie DeBartolo
Jan de Bont
Philippe de Broca
Fred de Cordova
Allen Coulter
Albert de Courville
Russell DeGrazier
Rolf de Heer
Fred Dekker
Alex de la Iglesia
Jean Delannoy
Bruce Dellis
Greg DeLiso
Hampton Del Ruth
Roy Del Ruth
Guillermo del Toro
Alberto De Martino
Kirk DeMicco
Cecil B. DeMille
William C. deMille
Jonathan Demme
Ted Demme
James DeMonaco
Jacques Demy
Reginald Denham
Robert De Niro
Claire Denis
Martin Dennis
Pen Densham
Ruggero Deodato
Manoel de Oliveira
Brian De Palma
Ben Palmer
Charles Palmer
Jake Paltrow
Serge de Poligny
Johnny Depp
John Derek
Maya Deren
Scott Derrickson
Bernard Derriman
Giuseppe de Santis
Vittorio De Sica
Tom DeSimone
Howard Deutch
Michel Deville
Danny DeVito
Dean Devlin
David Dhavan
Matthew Diamond
Emma-Rosa Dias
Tom DiCillo
Nigel Dick
Vivienne Dick
Ernest Dickerson
Thorold Dickinson
William Kennedy Dickson
Carlos Diegues
Vin Diesel
William Dieterle
Helmut Dietl
J. D. Dillard
John Francis Dillon
Michael Dante DiMartino
Mark Dindal
Mark A.Z. Dippé
Mike Disa
Lino DiSalvo
Walt Disney
Adriaan Ditvoorst
Ivan Dixon
Edward Dmytryk
Darren Doane
David Dobkin
Lawrence Dobkin
Pete Docter
Jacques Doillon
Michael Dolan
Xavier Dolan
Miles Doleac
Andrew Dominik
Roger Donaldson
Stanley Donen
Hwang Dong-hyuk
Ciaran Donnelly
Clive Donner
Richard Donner
Mark Donskoi
Robert Dornhelm
Doris Dörrie
Nelson Pereira dos Santos
Maïmouna Doucouré
Michael Dougherty
Gordon Douglas
Robert Douglas
Aleksandr Dovzhenko
Tony Dow
John Erick Dowdle
Kevin Dowling
B. E. Doxat-Pratt
Jim Drake
Oliver Drake
Polly Draper
Jean Dréville
Ben Drew
Carl Theodor Dreyer
Marcel Duchamp
Frederik Du Chau
Terence Dudley
Peter Duffell
Duffer brothers
Troy Duffy
Dennis Dugan
Joshua Dugdale
Bill Duke
Bruno Dumont
Duwayne Dunham
George Dunning
Cheryl Dunye
Quentin Dupieux
Jay Duplass
Mark Duplass
Ewald André Dupont
Momina Duraid
Marguerite Duras
Fred Durst
Richard Dutcher
Guru Dutt
Robert Duvall
Ava DuVernay
Julien Duvivier
Allan Dwan

Top of page

E

B. Reeves Eason
Clint Eastwood
Uli Edel
Blake Edwards
Gareth Edwards
Harry Edwards
Shawn Efran
Robert Eggers
Eagle Egilsson
Atom Egoyan
Mohammed Ehteshamuddin
Lena Einhorn
Sergei Eisenstein
Gösta Ekman
Richard Elfman
Stephan Elliott
David R. Ellis
Robert Ellis
Scott Ellis
Maurice Elvey
Obi Emelonye
John Emerson
Roland Emmerich
Andy De Emmony
Cy Endfield
John English
Robert Englund
Robert Enrico
Ray Enright
Jason Ensler
Ildikó Enyedi
Nora Ephron
Sheldon Epps
Jean Epstein
Luciano Ercoli
Víctor Erice
Chester Erskine
Juan Escobedo
Giancarlo Esposito
Danishka Esterhazy
Lukas Ettlin
Jean Eustache
David M. Evans
Gareth Evans
Marc Evans
Valie Export
Chris Eyre
Richard Eyre

Top of page

F

Peter Faiman
Ben Falcone
Rick Famuyiwa
James Fargo
Harun Farocki
Asghar Farhadi
Julian Farino
Valerie Faris
Bobby Farrelly
Peter Farrelly
John Farrow
Rainer Werner Fassbinder
Jon Favreau
Sam Feder
Fei Mu
Paul Feig
Henry Feinberg
Paul Fejos
Sam Fell
Andrea Fellers
Federico Fellini
Emerald Fennell
Michael Ferguson
Guy Ferland
Emilio Fernández
Abel Ferrara
Marco Ferreri
Giorgio Ferroni
Louis Feuillade
Jacques Feyder
Severin Fiala
Sally Field
Todd Field
Chip Fields
Ralph Fiennes
Mike Figgis
Dave Filoni
David Fincher
Will Finn
Elvira Fischer
Terence Fisher
Dallas M. Fitzgerald
George Fitzmaurice
Robert J. Flaherty
Mike Flanagan
Gary Fleder
Dave Fleischer
Max Fleischer
Richard Fleischer
Ruben Fleischer
Andrew Fleming
Victor Fleming
Anne Fletcher
Dexter Fletcher
Mandie Fletcher
Benedek Fliegauf
James Flood
Robert Florey
Emmett J. Flynn
Shannon Flynn
James Foley
Sheree Folkson
Jorge Fons
Aleksander Ford
Francis Ford
Jeremy J. Ford
John Ford
Philip Ford
Tom Ford
Eugene Forde
Miloš Forman
Tom Forman
Willi Forst
Marc Forster
Bill Forsyth
John Fortenberry
Bob Fosse
Jodie Foster
Lilibet Foster
Lewis R. Foster
Norman Foster
Jeff Fowler
Wallace Fox
Bryan Foy
Jonathan Frakes
Rhys Frake-Waterfield
Coleman Francis
James Franco
Jesús Franco
Georges Franju
Melvin Frank
Scott Frank
David Frankel
John Frankenheimer
Carl Franklin
Howard Franklin
Sidney Franklin
Veronika Franz
Harry L. Fraser
Toa Fraser
James Frawley
David Frazee
Stephen Frears
Riccardo Freda
Sydney Freeland
Thornton Freeland
Morgan Freeman
Morgan J. Freeman
Mark Freiburger
Lloyd French
Karl Freund
Ron Fricke
Fridrik Thor Fridriksson
Jason Friedberg
Lionel Friedberg
David Friedkin
William Friedkin
Seymour Friedman
Su Friedrich
Gunther von Fritsch
Carl Froelich
Sarah Frost
Soleil Moon Frye
Kinji Fukasaku
Shozin Fukui
Lucio Fulci
Sam Fuller
Antoine Fuqua
Sidney J. Furie
Tim Fywell

Top of page

G

Béla Gaál
Leonid Gaidai
Ray Gallardo
Florian Gallenberger
Alex Galvin
Harry Gamboa Jr.
Abel Gance
Christophe Gans
Dennis Gansel
Arline Gant
Carla Garapedian
Rodrigo García
Jeremy Garelick
Jeff Garlin
Tay Garnett
Philippe Garrel
Mick Garris
Matteo Garrone
Harry Garson
William Garwood
Louis J. Gasnier
Tucker Gates
Mark Gatiss
Tony Gatlif
Nils Gaup
Roberto Gavaldón
Barrie Gavin
Galder Gaztelu-Urrutia
Paul Geday
Jean Genet
Xavier Gens
Giacomo Gentilomo
Fred Gerber
 Aleksei Yuryevich German
 Aleksei Alekseivich German
Pietro Germi
Clyde Geronimi
Kurt Gerron
Douchan Gersi
Viktor Gertler
Ricky Gervais
Greta Gerwig
Jennifer Getzinger
Subhash Ghai
Ritwik Ghatak
Bahman Ghobadi
Charles Giblyn
Angela Gibson
Mel Gibson
Billy Gierhart
Joaquin "Kino" Gil
John Gilbert
Lewis Gilbert
David Giler
Stuart Gillard
Craig Gillespie
Terry Gilliam
Tyler Gillett
Vince Gilligan
John Gilling
Dan Gilroy
Tony Gilroy
Arvid E. Gillstrom
Bernard Girard
Marino Girolami
Ken Girotti
Pavel Giroud
Amos Gitai
Ellen Gittelsohn
Stanka Gjurić
Rose Glass
Lesli Linka Glatter
Jonathan Glazer
John Glen
Peter Glenville
James Glickenhaus
Will Gluck
Jean-Luc Godard
Andy Goddard
Drew Goddard
Theo van Gogh
Michael Goi
Menahem Golan
Evan Goldberg
Bobcat Goldthwait
Nick Gomez
Michel Gondry
Alejandro González Iñárritu
Martin Gooch
Derrick Goodwin
Leslie Goodwins
Rupert Goold
Adoor Gopalakrishnan
Bryan Gordon
George Gordon
Michael Gordon
Stuart Gordon
John Gorrie
Yana Gorskaya
Hideo Gosha
Ryan Gosling
Raja Gosnell
Lisa Gottlieb
Peter Gould
Alfred Goulding
Edmund Goulding
Ashutosh Gowariker
 Jake Graf
Todd Graff
William A. Graham
Michael Grandage
Brian Grant
Lee Grant
Alex Graves
F. Gary Gray
Adam Green
Alfred E. Green
Dave Green
David Green
David Gordon Green
Guy Green
Hilton A. Green
Norm Green
Pamela Green
Steph Green
Tom Green
Peter Greenaway
Josh Greenbaum
C. H. Greenblatt
Paul Greengrass
Jeff Greenstein
Robert Greenwald
Edwin Greenwood
Robert Gregson
Jean Grémillon
Johannes Grenzfurthner
John Greyson
John Grierson
Ken Grieve
D. W. Griffith
Edward H. Griffith
Murray Grigor
Peter Grimwade
Nick Grinde
David Grossman
Luca Guadagnino
Matthew Gray Gubler
Romolo Guerrieri
Christopher Guest
Val Guest
John Guillermin
Fred Guiol
Sacha Guitry
Yilmaz Güney
Andrew Gunn
James Gunn
Hrafn Gunnlaugsson
Manish Gupta
Stephen Gurewitz
Jorge Gutierrez
Sebastian Gutierrez
Alice Guy-Blaché
Patricio Guzmán

Top of page

H

Charles F. Haas
Kamal Haasan
Taylor Hackford
Zach Hadel
Tala Hadid
Lucile Hadžihalilović
Piers Haggard
Paul Haggis
Larry Hagman
Don Hahn
Antonio Margheriti
Jody Margolin Hahn
Charles Haid
Andrew Haigh
John Halas
Alexander Hall
Don Hall
Lasse Hallström
Victor Hugo Halperin
Gary Halvorson
Ryusuke Hamaguchi
John Hamburg
Bent Hamer
Robert Hamer
Guy Hamilton
Hamish Hamilton
Jonathan Hammond
Sanaa Hamri
Victor Hanbury
John D. Hancock
Michael Haneke
Tom Hanks
William Hanna
Ken Hannam
Curtis Hanson
Geir Hansteen Jörgensen
Alex Hardcastle
Neasa Hardiman
Catherine Hardwicke
Graeme Harper
Tom Harper
Veit Harlan
Renny Harlin
Harry Harris
Peter Harris
Mary Harron
Harvey Hart
William S. Hart
Hal Hartley
Anthony Harvey
Herk Harvey
Jack Harvey
Wojciech Has
Henry Hathaway
James Hawes
Howard Hawks
Will Hay
Salma Hayek
Michael Hayes.
David Hayman
James Hayman
Toby Haynes
Todd Haynes
Jimmy Hayward
Michel Hazanavicius
Amy Heckerling
Ralph Hemecker
Anthony Hemingway
Siân Heder
Victor Heerman
Zachary Heinzerling
Stuart Heisler
Brian Helgeland
Marielle Heller
Monte Hellman
Michael "Ffish" Hemschoot
Joseph Henabery
Chris Henchy
Florian Henckel von Donnersmarck
Dell Henderson
John Henderson
Frank Henenlotter
Hobart Henley
Paul Henreid
Julian Henriques
Buck Henry
Brian Henson
Jim Henson
Perry Henzell
Paula Heredia
Stephen Herek
Albert Herman
Oliver Hermanus
Kate Herron
William Blake Herron
Michael Herz
John Herzfeld
Werner Herzog
Zako Heskiya
Jared Hess
Jerusha Hess
Gordon Hessler
Marianne Hettinger
Jennifer Love Hewitt
David Hewlett
John Heys
Douglas Hickox
Scott Hicks
Howard Higgin
George Roy Hill
George Hill
Jack Hill
Jody Hill
Robert F. Hill
Sinclair Hill
Walter Hill
Stephen Hillenburg
Arthur Hiller
William Byron Hillman
Lambert Hillyer
Anthony Himbs
Art Hindle
Cheryl Hines
Ryūichi Hiroki
Oliver Hirschbiegel
Leon Hirszman
Leslie S. Hiscott
Alfred Hitchcock
Godfrey Ho
Mervyn Pinfield
Ho Ping
Steve Pink
Jessica Hobbs
Gregory Hoblit
Brent Hodge
Mike Hodges
Jack Hofsiss
James P. Hogan
P. J. Hogan
Clive Holden
Agnieszka Holland
Todd Holland
Tom Holland
Savage Steve Holland
Tonya Holly
Ben Holmes
John Holmquist
Seth Holt
Ishirō Honda
Mitsuru Hongo
Tobe Hooper
Tom Hooper
Stephen Hopkins
Dennis Hopper
Jerry Hopper
Gwyneth Horder-Payton
Leonard Horn
James W. Horne
Oliver Horsbrugh
Hou Hsiao-hsien
Li Hsing
John Hough
Bryce Dallas Howard
Byron Howard
David Howard
Michael Howard
Ron Howard
William Howard
Peter Howitt
King Hu
L. Ron Hubbard
Reginald Hudlin
Hugh Hudson
Bronwen Hughes
Howard Hughes
John Hughes
Ken Hughes
Robert F. Hughes
Terry Hughes
Ann Hui
Danièle Huillet
Arthur Humberstone
H. Bruce Humberstone
André Hunebelle
Helen Hunt
Tim Hunter
Lawrence Huntington
Nick Hurran
Michael Hurst
Sam Hurwitz
Metin Hüseyin
Waris Hussein
John Huston
Charles Hutchison
Brian G. Hutton
Willard Huyck
Peter Hyams

Top of page

I

Armando Iannucci
Juan Ibáñez
Kon Ichikawa
Steve Ihnat
Brian Iles
Im Kwon-Taek
Shōhei Imamura
Michael Imison
Hiroshi Inagaki
John Ince
Ralph Ince
Thomas H. Ince
Rex Ingram
Ciro Ippolito
Dickson Iroegbu
John Irvin
George Irving
Kyōhei Ishiguro
Debbie Isitt
Marc Israel
Jūzō Itami
Aleksandr Ivanovsky
Ivan Ivanov-Vano
Joris Ivens
James Ivory

Top of page

J

Jacques Jaccard
David Jackson
Dianne Jackson
Michael Jackson
Mick Jackson
Paul Jackson
Peter Jackson
Wilfred Jackson
Gregory Jacobs
Rick Jacobson
Sarah Jacobson
Henry Jaglom
Wanda Jakubowska
Alan James
Steve James
Miklós Jancsó
Leigh Janiak
Jang Joon-hwan
Bob Jaques
Derek Jarman
Jim Jarmusch
Julian Jarrold
Charles Jarrott
Risto Jarva
Leigh Jason
Kang Je-gyu
Barry Jenkins
Dallas Jenkins
Patty Jenkins
Garth Jennings
Humphrey Jennings
Shelley Jensen
Jean-Pierre Jeunet
Norman Jewison
Jia Zhangke
Jiang Wen
Jaromil Jireš
Phil Joanou
Alejandro Jodorowsky
Mark Joffe
Roland Joffé
Clark Johnson
Craig Johnson
Duke Johnson
Lamont Johnson
Liza Johnson
Mark Steven Johnson
Nunnally Johnson
Rian Johnson
Tim Johnson
Joe Johnston
Gerard Johnstone
Angelina Jolie
Chuck Jones
Duncan Jones
F. Richard Jones
Grover Jones
Michael Jones
Ron Jones
Terry Jones
Tommy Lee Jones
Spike Jonze
Neil Jordan
Edward José
Max Joseph
Jon Jost
Louis Jouvet
Paul Joyce
Jonathan Judge
Mike Judge
Rupert Julian
Isaac Julien
Miranda July
Nathan Juran

Top of page

K

Karel Kachyňa
George Kaczender
Jeremy Kagan
Mauricio Kagel
Joseph Kahn
Sathish Kalathil
Mikhail Kalatozov
Alex Kalymnios
Kamal
Arunraja Kamaraj
Sekhar Kammula
Deborah Kampmeier
Puttanna Kanagal
Adam Kane
Joseph Kane
Shusuke Kaneko
Jeff Kanew
Garson Kanin
Jonathan Kaplan
Raj Kapoor
Shekhar Kapur
Pekka Karjalainen
Phil Karlson
Roman Karmen
Jason Kartalian
Jake Kasdan
Lawrence Kasdan
Mathieu Kassovitz
Aaron Katz
Lloyd Kaufman
Philip Kaufman
Aki Kaurismäki
Mika Kaurismäki
Helmut Käutner
Jerzy Kawalerowicz
Minoru Kawasaki
Tony Kaye
Elia Kazan
Helmut Käutner
Buster Keaton
Abdellatif Kechiche
William Keighley
Asaad Kelada
Frederick King Keller
Harry Keller
Michael Keller
Barnet Kellman
Brian Kelly
Gene Kelly
Richard Kelly
Gil Kenan
David Kendall
Alex Kendrick
Erle Kenton
James V. Kern
David Kerr
Robert Kerr
Michael Kerrigan
Irvin Kershner
James Kerwin
Abbas Kiarostami
Krzysztof Kieślowski
Maggie Kiley
Edward Killy
Kim Jee-woon
Kim Ki-duk
Max Kimmich
Anthony Kimmins
Simon Kinberg
Burton King
Gary King
George King
Henry King
Louis King
Paul King
Shaka King
Stephen King
Keisuke Kinoshita
Klaus Kinski
Teinosuke Kinugasa
Brian Kirk
Randal Kirk
Mark Kirkland
Lyudmil Kirkov
Karey Kirkpatrick
Alan Kirschenbaum
Ryuhei Kitamura
Takeshi Kitano
Alf Kjellin
William Klein
Randal Kleiser
Elem Klimov
León Klimovsky 
Alexander Kluge
Jennifer Kluska
Harley Knoles
Kevin Ko
Masaki Kobayashi
Chris Koch
Kogonada
Bob Koherr
Vincent Kok
Henry Kolker
Alexander Kolowrat
Satoshi Kon
Andrei Konchalovsky
Larysa Kondracki
Tadeusz Konwicki
Alexander Korda
Zoltan Korda
Hirokazu Koreeda
Harmony Korine
Caryl Korma
Baltasar Kormákur
Brigitte Kornetzky
John Korty
Joseph Kosinski
Henry Koster
Ted Kotcheff
Mariusz Kotowski
Serguei Kouchnerov
Nikos Koundouros
Jan Kounen
Paul Kowalski
Aaron Kozak
Ivan Kraljevic
Stanley Kramer
John Krasinski
Kurt Kren
Mitchell Kriegman
Krishnan–Panju
William Kronick
Stanley Kubrick
George Kuchar
Lev Kuleshov
Roger Kumble
Zacharias Kunuk
Akira Kurosawa
Kiyoshi Kurosawa
Karyn Kusama
Emir Kusturica
Geir Ove Kvalheim
Daniel Kwan
Stanley Kwan
Ken Kwapis

Top of page

L

John La Bouchardière
Nadine Labaki
Neil LaBute
Gregory La Cava
Harry Lachman
Aldo Lado
Edward Laemmle
James Lafferty
John Lafia
René Laloux
Ringo Lam
Fernando Lamas
Mary Lambert
Charles Lamont
Lew Landers
Alejandro Landes
John Landis
Max Landis
Christopher Landon
Sidney Lanfield
Fritz Lang
Walter Lang
Michael Lange
Rémi Lange
Jerry Langford
Doug Langway
Yorgos Lanthimos
Claude Lanzmann
Janez Lapajne
Victoria Larimore
Pablo Larraín
John Lasseter
Andrew Lau
Jeffrey Lau
Peter Lauer
Charles Laughton
Mélanie Laurent
Carl Lauten
Arnold Laven
Diarmuid Lawrence
Francis Lawrence
Marc Lawrence
J. F. Lawton
Tracie Laymon
Paul Lazarus
Philip Leacock
David Lean
Patrice Leconte
Bruce Leddy
Mimi Leder
D. Ross Lederman
Ang Lee
David Lee
Jennifer Lee
Lee Chang-dong
Lee Cheol-ha
Lee Lik-Chi
Rowland V. Lee
Spike Lee
Michael Leeston-Smith
Michael Lehmann
Henry Lehrman
Larry Leichliter
Julia Leigh
Mike Leigh
Danny Leiner
Mitchell Leisen
Logan Leistikow
David Leitch
Józef Lejtes
Claude Lelouch
Michael Lembeck
Kasi Lemmons
John Lemont
Jay Lender
Umberto Lenzi
Robert Z. Leonard
Damien Leone
Sergio Leone
John R. Leonetti
Tony Leondis
Robert Lepage
Peter Lepeniotis
Louis Le Prince
Mervyn LeRoy
Michael Lessac
George Lessey
Mark L. Lester
Richard Lester
Louis Leterrier
Jørgen Leth
Jared Leto
Rob Letterman
Barry Letts
Brian Levant
Henry Levin
Ken Levine
Barry Levinson
Shawn Levy
Shuki Levy
Herschell Gordon Lewis
Jerry Lewis
Joseph H. Lewis
Leonard Lewis
Phill Lewis
Paul Lieberstein
Jonathan Liebesman
Li Han-Hsiang
Lee Tit
Li Yang
Desiree Lim
Doug Liman
Brian Limond
Fred J. Lincoln
Max Linder
Tobias Lindholm
Willy Lindwer
Graham Linehan
Richard Linklater
Matt Lipsey
Oldřich Lipský
Steven Lisberger
Miguel Littín
Dwight H. Little
Lynne Littman
Anatole Litvak
Luis Llosa
Frank Lloyd
Norman Lloyd
Phyllida Lloyd
Lo Wei
Ken Loach
Sondra Locke
Barbara Loden
Joshua Logan
Ulli Lommel
Richard Loncraine
Jerry London
Kenneth Lonergan
Stanley Long
Robert Longo
Del Lord
Peter Lord
 Ian Lorimer
Chuck Lorre
Joseph Losey
Todd Louiso
Lou Ye
David Lowery
Declan Lowney
Philippa Lowthorpe
Arthur Lubin
Ernst Lubitsch
George Lucas
John Meredyth Lucas
Wilfred Lucas
Edward Ludwig
Baz Luhrmann
Sidney Lumet
Leopold Lummerstorfer
Kátia Lund
Ida Lupino
Rod Lurie
Don Lusk
Hamilton Luske
Dorothy Lyman
Euros Lyn
David Lynch
Jeffrey Lynch
Jennifer Lynch
Liam Lynch
Adrian Lyne
Jonathan Lynn

Top of page

M

Ma–Mc

David MacDonald
Hettie MacDonald
Kevin Macdonald
Carl Macek
Seth MacFarlane
Gustav Machatý
Willard Mack
Alexander Mackendrick
David Mackenzie
Philip Charles MacKenzie
Will Mackenzie
Douglas Mackinnon
Gillies MacKinnon
Angus MacLane
Michelle MacLaren
Murdock MacQuarrie
John Madden
Guy Maddin
Madonna
Holger-Madsen
Ivan Magrin-Chagnolleau
Brendan Maher
Barry Mahon
Charles Maigne
Norman Mailer
Alan Mak
Dušan Makavejev
Mohsen Makhmalbaf
Samira Makhmalbaf
Károly Makk
Sundeep Malani
Terrence Malick
Louis Malle
Nicholas Mallett
William Malone
David Maloney
Leo D. Maloney
Henrik Malyan
Djibril Diop Mambéty
Manakis brothers
Milcho Manchevski
Don Mancini
David Mandel
Chris Mandia
Luis Mandoki
James Mangold
Joseph L. Mankiewicz
Anthony Mann
Daniel Mann
Delbert Mann
Michael Mann
Seith Mann
Guy Manos
Sophie Marceau
Terry Marcel
Max Marcin
Nick Marck 
Bam Margera
Edwin L. Marin
José Mojica Marins
Chris Marker
Richard Marquand
Laïla Marrakchi
James Marsh
Jeff "Swampy" Marsh
Frank Marshall
Garry Marshall
George Marshall
Neil Marshall
Penny Marshall
Rob Marshall
Joshua Marston
Lucrecia Martel
Becky Martin
Charles Martin
Darnell Martin
D'Urville Martin
Henry G. Martin
Jim Martin
Murray Martin
Phillip Martin
Richard Martin
Sergio Martino
Steve Martino
Marco Martins
Leslie H. Martinson
Derek Martinus
Andrew Marton
Nico Mastorakis
George Mastras
Camillo Mastrocinque
Yasuzo Masumura
Arūnas Matelis
Sean Mathias
Melina Matsoukas
Katsuya Matsumura
Bruno Mattei
Elaine May
Juliet May
Russ Mayberry
Tony Maylam
Archie Mayo
Brad Mays
Dan Mazer
Paul Mazursky
Glen Mazzara
Kenny McBain
Jim McBride
Leo McCarey
Ray McCarey
Colm McCarthy
Tom McCarthy
Brendan McCaul
Nelson McCormick
George McCowan
John Michael McDonagh
Martin McDonagh
Frank McDonald
Terry McDonough
Charles McDougall
Bernard McEveety
Vincent McEveety
McG
William C. McGann
Scott McGehee
J. P. McGowan
Robert F. McGowan
Craig McCracken
Tom McGrath
Joseph McGrath
William McGregor
Paul McGuigan
Adam McKay
David McKay
Jim McKay
John McKay
Lucky McKee
Kevin McKidd
Norman McLaren
Greg McLean
Norman Z. McLeod
Tom McLoughlin
Sean McNamara
John McNaughton
Daniel McNicoll
Robert Duncan McNeill
Steve McQueen
John McTiernan

Top of page

Md–Mz

Shane Meadows
Peter Medak
Don Medford
Dariush Mehrjui
Deepa Mehta
Gus Meins
Fernando Meirelles
Adolfas Mekas
Jonas Mekas
Bill Melendez
George Melford
Wilco Melissant
James Melkonian
Jeff Melman
Craig Melville
Jean-Pierre Melville
Lothar Mendes
Sam Mendes
Jim Mendiola
Linda Mendoza
Chris Menges
Meera Menon
Stephen Merchant
E. Elias Merhige
Saul Metzstein
Jeff Meyer
Russ Meyer
Leah Meyerhoff
Georges Méliès
Richard Michaels
Oscar Micheaux
Roger Michell
Pete Michels
Jim Mickle
Takashi Miike
Nikita Mikhalkov
Lewis Milestone
John Milius
Bennett Miller
Frank Miller
George Miller
Kara Miller
Randall Miller
Robert Ellis Miller
Sam Miller
Sharron Miller
Sidney Miller
Tim Miller
Crispian Mills
Rusty Mills
Daniel Minahan
Steve Miner
Anthony Minghella
Joseph Minion
Rob Minkoff
Vincente Minnelli
Eugenio Mira
Emilio Miraglia
Lin-Manuel Miranda
Koki Mitani
David Robert Mitchell
Howard M. Mitchell
John Cameron Mitchell
Mike Mitchell
Noël Mitrani
David Mitton
Goro Miyazaki
Hayao Miyazaki
Kenji Mizoguchi
Peter Moffatt
Alfred Molina
Édouard Molinaro
Christine Molloy
Zac Moncrief
Mario Monicelli
Cesar Montano
Eduardo Montes-Bradley
Dave Moody
Lukas Moodysson
Irving J. Moore
Michael Moore
Randy Moore
Rich Moore
Robert Moore
Stan Moore
Jocelyn Moorhouse
Ken Mora
Jacobo Morales
Pierre Morel
Nanni Moretti
Harry Morgan
Sidney Morgan
Anders Morgenthaler
Shuhei Morita
Chris Morris
Errol Morris
Jennifer Morrison
Vic Morrow
Hollingsworth Morse
Terry O. Morse
Catherine Morshead
Cynthia Mort 
Edmund Mortimer
Lemohang Jeremiah Mosese
Scott Mosier
Craig Moss
Katsuyuki Motohiro
Greg Mottola
Wagner Moura
Norbert Moutier
Allan Moyle
Otto Muehl
Russell Mulcahy
John Mulholland
Robert Mulligan
Andrzej Munk
Kira Muratova
Walter Murch
F. W. Murnau
Dudley Murphy
Geoff Murphy
Ralph Murphy
Ryan Murphy
Bill Murray
Noam Murro
John Musker
Floyd Mutrux
Mark Mylod
Daniel Myrick

Top of page

N

Amir Naderi
Kenji Nagasaki
Mira Nair
Ilya Naishuller
Takashi Nakamura
Hideo Nakata
Bharat Nalluri
Khodzha Kuli Narliyev
Mikio Naruse
Janusz Nasfeter
Percy Nash
Vincenzo Natali
Matthew Nastuk
Gregory Nava
Doug Naylor
Ray Nazarro
Ronald Neame
Jean Negulesco
Marshall Neilan
Roy William Neill
James Neilson
Victor Nelli Jr.
Gary Nelson
Gene Nelson
Jessie Nelson
Ozzie Nelson
Ralph Nelson
Laura Neri
Max Neufeld
Kurt Neumann
Kyle Newacheck
Mike Newell
Sam Newfield
Don Newland
John Newland
Joseph Newman
Fred Newmeyer
Lionel Ngakane
Thuc Nguyen
Fred Niblo
Andrew Niccol
George Nicholls Jr.
Charles August Nichols
Jeff Nichols
Mike Nichols
Jack Nicholson
Cedric Nicolas-Troyan
Greg Nicotero
William Nigh
Nikos Nikolaidis
Leopoldo Torre Nilsson
Rob Nilsson
Leonard Nimoy
Marcus Nispel
David Nixon
Manfred Noa
Gaspar Noé
Christopher Nolan
Chris Noonan
Tom Noonan
Syed Noor
Paul Norman
Mabel Normand
Edward Norton
Jehane Noujaim
Wilfred Noy
Phillip Noyce
Elliott Nugent
David Nutter
Bruno Nuytten
Andy Nwakalor
Christian Nyby

Top of page

O

Dave O'Brien
Katharine O'Brien
Andrew O'Connor
Renee O'Connor
Bob Odenkirk
Atsushi Ogata
Perry Ogden
George Ogilvie
Kingsley Ogoro
Izu Ojukwu
Kihachi Okamoto
Sidney Olcott
Liddy Oldroyd
Jorge Olguín
Ron Oliver
Susan Oliver
Laurence Olivier
Ermanno Olmi
Gunnar Olsson
Max Ophüls
Joshua Oppenheimer
Benjamin Orifici
Kenny Ortega
Mamoru Oshii
Nagisa Oshima
Ruben Östlund
Richard Oswald
Dominique Othenin-Girard
Katsuhiro Otomo
Ulrike Ottinger
Idrissa Ouedraogo
Horace Ové
Jennifer Oxley
Frank Oz
François Ozon
Yasujirō Ozu

Top of page

P

Sergio Pablos
Georg Wilhelm Pabst
P. Padmarajan
Alan J. Pakula
Debarun Pal
Jafar Panahi
Norman Panama
Gleb Panfilov
Pang Ho-Cheung
Domenico Paolella
Sergei Parajanov
K-Michel Parandi
Dean Parisot
Lana Parrilla
Richard Parry
Park Chan-Wook
Jerry Paris
Nick Park
Alan Parker
Albert Parker
Ol Parker
Trey Parker
James Parrott
Reza Parsa
Gabriel Pascal
Goran Paskaljević
Pier Paolo Pasolini
Ivan Passer
Stuart Paton
John Patterson
Ray Patterson
Anand Patwardhan
Frank Paur
Paweł Pawlikowski
Alexander Payne
György Pálfi
Leslie Pearce
Richard Pearce
Steve Pearlman
George Pearson
Raoul Peck
Sam Peckinpah
Mario Van Peebles
Jordan Peele
Scott Pembroke
Arthur Penn
Leo Penn
Matthew Penn
Sean Penn
Joe Penna
Mark Pellington
Ivan Perestiani
Lester James Peries
Pierre Perifel
Loni Peristere
Anthony Perkins
Oz Perkins
Quincy Perkins
Léonce Perret
Nat Perrin
Frank Perry
Tyler Perry
Christian Peschken
Robert O. Peters
Wolfgang Petersen
David Petrarca
Daniel Petrie
Donald Petrie
Elio Petri
Christian Petzold
Joseph Pevney
Todd Phillips
Maurice Pialat
Irving Pichel
Andy Picheta
Frank Pierson
Derek Pike
Lucian Pintilie
Robert Pirosh
Noam Pitlik
Pitof
René Plaissetty
Tony Plana
Bill Plympton
Jeremy Podeswa
Ihor Podolchak
Sidney Poitier
Roman Polanski
Dominic Polcino
Mark Polish
Michael Polish
Rudolph Polk
Kay Pollak
Sydney Pollack
Harry A. Pollard
Lindsey Pollard
John Polson
Joshua Pomer
Ellen Pompeo
Gillo Pontecorvo
Edwin S. Porter
Geoff Posner
Ted Post
H. C. Potter
Sally Potter
Richard Pottier
Alan Poul
Dan Povenmire
Jeff Povey
Frank Powell
Michael Powell
Paul Powell
Kemp Powers
Rosa von Praunheim
Otto Preminger
Emeric Pressburger
Ellen S. Pressman
Michael Pressman
Lonny Price
Sarah Price
Prince
Yakov Protazanov
Alex Proyas
Aleksandr Ptushko
Vsevolod Pudovkin
Jon Puno
Derek Purvis
Ivan Pyryev
Parvez Sharma
Top of page

Q

Farooq Qaiser
Steven Quale
Brothers Quay
John Quigley
Richard Quine
James Quinn
Faisal Qureshi
Nabeel Qureshi

Top of page

R

Ra–Re

Peer Raben
Michael Radford
Bob Rafelson
Jeff Ragsdale
Sam Raimi
Yvonne Rainer
Hossein Rajabian
S. S. Rajamouli
Sharat Raju
Harold Ramis
Julius Ramsay
Lynne Ramsay
Tony Randel
Arthur Rankin Jr.
Irving Rapper
Mani Ratnam
Brett Ratner
Gregory Ratoff
John Rawlins
Albert Ray
Bernard B. Ray
Fred Olen Ray
Man Ray
Nicholas Ray
Rick Ray
Satyajit Ray
Herman C. Raymaker
Bobby Razak
Patrick Rea
Jim Reardon
Eric Red
Robert Redford
Carol Reed
Peyton Reed
Robert Reed
Dee Rees
Christopher Reeve
Keanu Reeves
Matt Reeves
Michael Reeves
Nicolas Winding Refn
Godfrey Reggio
Kelly Reichardt
Willy Reiber
Daina Reid
Carl Reiner
Rob Reiner
Max Reinhardt
Irving Reis
Charles Reisner
Karel Reisz
Wolfgang Reitherman
Ivan Reitman
Jason Reitman
Edgar Reitz
Chris Renaud
Drew Renaud
Johan Renck
Jean Renoir
Rob Renzetti
Alain Resnais
Adam Resnick
Carlos Reygadas
Gene Reynolds
Kevin Reynolds
Lynn Reynolds

Top of page

Rf–Rz

Mike Rianda
David Lowell Rich
John Rich
Tony Richardson
Hans Richter
W. D. Richter
Tom Ricketts
Leni Riefenstahl
Ransom Riggs
Alrick Riley
Wolf Rilla
Arthur Ripley
Arturo Ripstein
Guy Ritchie
Michael Ritchie
Martin Ritt
Karl Ritter
Christian Rivers
Fernand Rivers
Joan Rivers
Jacques Rivette
Jamie Rix
Parveen Rizvi
Saeed Rizvi
Jay Roach
Alain Robbe-Grillet
Brian Robbins
Jerome Robbins
Tim Robbins
Brian K. Roberts
Johannes Roberts
Pennant Roberts
Stephen Roberts
Graham Robertson
John S. Robertson
Arthur Robison
Bruce Robinson
Lee Robinson
Matthew Robinson
Matthew Robinson
Phil Alden Robinson
Mark Robson
Adam Robitel
Glauber Rocha
Alexandre Rockwell
João Pedro Rodrigues
Robert Rodriguez
Rosemary Rodriguez
John Roecker
Nicolas Roeg
Daniel Roemer
Michael Roemer
Albert S. Rogell
Seth Rogen
Brandon Rogers
David Rogers
Éric Rohmer
Alice Rohrwacher
James Rolfe
Mark Romanek
George A. Romero
Joaquín Luis Romero Marchent
Mikhail Romm
Am Rong
Bethany Rooney
Mickey Rooney
Cliff Roquemore
Bernard Rose
Phil Rosen
Stuart Rosenberg
Rick Rosenthal
Tatia Rosenthal
Perry Rosemond
Mark Rosman
Gary Ross
Herbert Ross
Matthew Ross
Roberto Rossellini
Robert Rossen
Franco Rossi
Arthur Rosson
Richard Rosson
Eli Roth
Joe Roth
Tim Roth
Richard Rothstein
Josie Rourke
Roy Rowland
Patricia Rozema
Joseph Ruben
Alan Rudolph
Oscar Rudolph
Wesley Ruggles
Raúl Ruiz
Pavel Ruminov
Richard Rush
Chuck Russell
David O. Russell
Ken Russell
Paddy Russell
Russo brothers
Stefan Ruzowitzky
Eldar Ryazanov
Zbigniew Rybczyński
Mark Rydell
Gary Rydstrom
Stellan Rye
RZA

Top of page

S

Sa–Sh

Maher Sabry
Daniel Sackheim
Christopher Sadler
Numa Sadoul
Safdie brothers
Boris Sagal
Bob Saget
Abdulkadir Ahmed Said
Richard Sakai
Alik Sakharov
Gene Saks
Sidney Salkow
Eriq La Salle
Walter Salles
Dan Sallitt
Mikael Salomon
Anja Salomonowitz
Carlos Saldanha
Victor Salva
Shakti Samanta
Gabriela Samper
Keith Samples
Ari Sandel
Scott Sanders
Helma Sanders-Brahms
Arlene Sanford
Shin Sang-ok
Jay Sandrich
Mark Sandrich
David Sant
Alfred Santell
Joseph Santley
Damon Santostefano
Miguel Sapochnik
Richard C. Sarafian
Valeria Sarmiento
Michael Sarnoski
Peter Sasdy
Shinsuke Sato
Yūichi Satō
Marjane Satrapi
Charles Saunders (director)
Hubert Sauper
Claude Sautet
Fred Savage
Philip Saville
Seth Savoy
Donald Sawyer
Geoffrey Sax
John Sayles
Rodo Sayagues
John Scagliotti
Armand Schaefer
George Schaefer
Akiva Schaffer
Jeff Schaffer
Franklin Schaffner
Peter Schamoni
Frank Scheffer
Daniel Scheinert
Fred Schepisi
Victor Schertzinger
Paul Scheuring
Kyle Schickner
Thomas Schlamme
Craig Schlattman
John Schlesinger
Christoph Schlingensief
Volker Schlöndorff
David Schmoeller
Julian Schnabel
Thomas Schnauz
Dan Schneider
Ian Schneider
Paul Schneider
Rob Schneider
Ernest B. Schoedsack
Renen Schorr
Paul Schrader
Rick Schroder
Barbet Schroeder
Werner Schroeter
John Schultz
Michael Schultz
Hugh Schulze
Joel Schumacher
Reinhold Schünzel
Lloyd J. Schwartz
Rudolf Schwarzkogler
Stefan Schwartz
Til Schweiger
Robert Schwentke
David Schwimmer
Christian Schwochow
Ettore Scola
Martin Scorsese
Oz Scott
Ridley Scott
Shaun Scott
Swinton O. Scott III
Tony Scott
Aubrey Scotto
Steven Seagal
Francis Searle
Fred F. Sears
Eric Dean Seaton
George Seaton
Edward Sedgwick
Alex Segal
Peter Segal
Susan Seidelman
Ulrich Seidl
Lewis Seiler
William A. Seiter
Franz Seitz, Sr.
George Seitz
Steve Sekely
Lesley Selander
Henry Selick
Bill Sellars
Herbert Selpin
Aaron Seltzer
David Seltzer
Selvaraghavan
Edgar Selwyn
Ousmane Sembène
Larry Semon
Mrinal Sen
Dominic Sena
Lorraine Senna
Mack Sennett
Craig Serling
Menelik Shabazz
Tom Shadyac
Matt Shakman
Lee Shallat Chemel
S. Shankar
Adam Shankman
John Patrick Shanley
Ted Sharks
Tristram Shapeero
Parvez Sharma
Jim Sharman
William Shatner
Melville Shavelson
Jenn Shaw
Larry Shaw
Scott Shaw
Jack Shea
Barry Shear
Chuck Sheetz
Lynn Shelton
Millicent Shelton
Ron Shelton
Darren Shepherd
Larisa Shepitko
Adrian Shergold
Jim Sheridan
Kirsten Sheridan
Rondell Sheridan
Taylor Sheridan
Gary Sherman
George Sherman
Lowell Sherman
Vincent Sherman
Domee Shi
John Shiban
Steve Shill
Takashi Shimizu
Peter Shin
Naoyoshi Shiotani
Alexandra Shiva
Daryush Shokof
Jack Sholder
Cate Shortland
Wil Shriner
M. Night Shyamalan
Charles Shyer
Ginny Stikeman
Joe Simon

Top of page

Si–Sz

George Sidney
Scott Sidney
David Siegel
Don Siegel
Ted Sieger
Pedro Sienna
Floria Sigismondi
Slobodan Šijan
Brad Silberling
David Silverman
Dean Silvers
Lisa Simon
S. Sylvan Simon
Yves Simoneau
Giorgio Simonelli
Alexander Singer
Bryan Singer
Manmohan Singh
Tarsem Singh
Tony Singletary
John Singleton
Roger Singleton-Turner
Robert Siodmak
Puneet Sira
Douglas Sirk
Cheick Oumar Sissoko
Andrea Sisson
Chris Sivertson
Tom Six
Vilgot Sjöman
Victor Sjöström
Kari Skogland
Jerzy Skolimowski
Gia Skova
David Slade
Paul Sloane
Edward Sloman
Michael Slovis
Yannis Smaragdis
Alan Smart
Ralph Smart
Jack Smight
Adam Smith
Brian Trenchard-Smith
Charles Martin Smith
Christopher Smith
David Smith
Gary Smith
George Albert Smith
Harry Everett Smith
Jim Field Smith
John Smith
John N. Smith
Julia Smith
Kevin Smith
Michael V. Smith
Noel M. Smith
Roy Allen Smith
Sarah Smith
Seth Grahame-Smith
Simon J. Smith
Adam Smoluk
Michael Snow
Zack Snyder
Michele Soavi
Steven Soderbergh
Gennady Sokolsky
Aleksandr Sokurov
David Solomon
Frances-Anne Solomon
Todd Solondz
Andrew Solt
Stephen Sommers
Barry Sonnenfeld
Sion Sono
Paolo Sorrentino
Jen and Sylvia Soska
Tressie Souders
Simon Spencer
George Spenton-Foster
Jaap Speyer
Penelope Spheeris
Bryan Spicer
Steven Spielberg
Götz Spielmann
Spierig brothers
Bob Spiers
Roger Spottiswoode
Jill Sprecher
Alejandro Springall
Aaron Springer
R. G. Springsteen
Anthony Stacchi
John M. Stahl
Sylvester Stallone
Andrew Stanton
Wendey Stanzler
Ladislas Starevich
Jack Starrett
Richard Starzak
Ralph Staub
Malcolm St. Clair
J.A. Steel
Burr Steers
Paul L. Stein
David Steinberg
Hans Steinhoff
Steno (director)
Boris Stepantsev
Mike Stephens
Jared Stern
Sandor Stern
Steven Hilliard Stern
Andrew Stevens
Dan Stevens
George Stevens
George Stevens Jr.
Robert Stevens
Robert Stevenson
Gordon Stewart
Ben Stiller
Mauritz Stiller
Whit Stillman
Francis Stokes
Marcus Stokes
Mike Stoklasa
Nicholas Stoller
Benjamin Stoloff
Andrew L. Stone
Ezra Stone
Jamie Magnus Stone
Matt Stone
Oliver Stone
Tad Stones
Howard Storm
Jerome Storm
Jean-Marie Straub
Frank R. Strayer
Suresh Joachim
Amanda Street
Graham Streeter
Barbra Streisand
Brenda Strong
James Strong
John Stroud
Mel Stuart
Gene Stupnitsky
John Sturges
Preston Sturges
K. Subash
Arne Sucksdorff
Elia Suleiman
Sun Yu
Mohit Suri
Stephen Surjik
A. Edward Sutherland
Hal Sutherland
Kiefer Sutherland
Seijun Suzuki
Jan Švankmajer
Mary Sweeney
Harry Sweet
Justin Swibel
David Swift
Hans-Jürgen Syberberg
Khady Sylla
István Szabó
Peter Szewczyk
Damián Szifron
Małgorzata Szumowska

Top of page

T

Rachel Talalay
Patrick Tam
Lee Tamahori
Cyndi Tang
Alain Tanner
Danis Tanović
Quentin Tarantino
Andrei Tarkovsky
Béla Tarr
Genndy Tartakovsky
Frank Tashlin
Jacques Tati
Norman Taurog
Bertrand Tavernier
Alan Taylor
Don Taylor
Don Taylor
Ray Taylor
Sam Taylor
Stanner E.V. Taylor
William Desmond Taylor
Colin Teague
Lewis Teague
André Téchiné
Julien Temple
Suzie Templeton
Larry Teng
Andy Tennant
George Terwilliger
Hiroshi Teshigahara
Duccio Tessari
Ted Tetzlaff
Kirk Thatcher
Wilhelm Thiele
Gerald Thomas
John G. Thomas
Ralph Thomas
Bernard Thompson
Caroline Thompson
J. Lee Thompson
Tommy Thompson
Robert Thornby
Billy Bob Thornton
Richard Thorpe
Rawson Marshall Thurber
Paul Tibbitt
Greg Tiernan
George Tillman Jr.
Constance Tillotson
Tony Tilse
Mihai Timofti
Bruce Timm
James Tinling
Phil Tippett
Justin Tipping
Romeo Tirone
Johnnie To
James Toback
Norman Tokar
Jan Tománek
Mattson Tomlin
Liesl Tommy
Mark Tonderai
Aad van Toor
Hisayuki Toriumi
Giuseppe Tornatore
Miguel Contreras Torres
Ivan Tors
André de Toth
Laurent Touil-Tartour
Viktor Tourjansky
Jacques Tourneur
Maurice Tourneur
Robert Townsend
Frederick E.O. Toye
Wendy Toye
Josh Trank
David Trainer
David Owen Trainor
Pablo Trapero
Pete Travis
Scott Treleaven
Jeff Tremaine
Jesús Salvador Treviño
Joachim Trier
Laurence Trimble
Nadine Trintignant
Jan Troell
Alice Troughton
Gary Trousdale
Keith Truesdell
François Truffaut
Ming-liang Tsai
Peter Tscherkassky
Tsui Hark
Shinya Tsukamoto
Stanley Tucci
Anand Tucker
Rex Tucker
Gary J. Tunnicliffe
Brad Turner
Jon Turteltaub
Frank Tuttle
David Twohy
Chris Twomey
Michael Tyburski
Tom Tykwer
Morten Tyldum
George Tyne
George Tzavellas

Top of page

U

Gustav Ucicky
Edgar G. Ulmer
Ron Underwood
Lee Unkrich
Upendra
Michael Uppendahl
Urszula Urbaniak
Carl Urbano
Chano Urueta
Carly Usdin
Kinka Usher
Peter Ustinov
Roar Uthaug

Top of page

V

Roger Vadim
Ladislao Vajda
Luis Valdez
Steve Valentine
Tonino Valerii
Mike Valerio
Jean-Marc Vallée
Jackie van Beek
W. S. Van Dyke
Thurop Van Orman
Vanelle
Andre van Heerden
Buddy Van Horn
Erik Van Looy
Tim Van Patten
Melvin Van Peebles
Gus Van Sant
Florestano Vancini
Norman Thaddeus Vane
Carlo Vanzina
Agnès Varda
Giuseppe Vari
Ram Gopal Varma
Marcel Varnel
Petar B. Vasilev
Tom Vaughan
Matthew Vaughn
Joe Vaux
Pam Veasey
Perry N. Vekroff
Milo Ventimiglia
Gore Verbinski
Sidney Cole
Tristan de Vere Cole
John David Coles
Paul Verhoeven
Dziga Vertov
Charles Vidor
King Vidor
Berthold Viertel
Denis Villeneuve
Robert G. Vignola
Jean Vigo
Vijayakrishnan
Agusti Villaronga
Robert Vince
Thomas Vinterberg
Luchino Visconti
Biju Viswanath
K. Viswanath
Erik Voake
Jordan Vogt-Roberts
Géza von Bolváry
Géza von Cziffra
Daisy von Scherler Mayer
Josef von Sternberg
Erich von Stroheim
Lars von Trier
Margarethe von Trotta
Bernard Vorhaus
Slavko Vorkapić
Kurt Voss
Jürgen Vsych

Top of page

W

The Wachowskis
Michael Wadleigh
Wai Ka-Fai
Rupert Wainwright
Taika Waititi
Andrzej Wajda
Chris Walas
John Walker
Stuart Walker
David Wall
Randall Wallace
Richard Wallace
Tommy Lee Wallace
Herb Wallerstein
Tom Walls
Aisling Walsh
Dearbhla Walsh
Raoul Walsh
Charles Walters
Christoph Waltz
Wan brothers
James Wan
Sam Wanamaker
Lulu Wang
Wang Quan'an
Wang Xiaoshuai
Wayne Wang
Albert Ward
David S. Ward
Vincent Ward
Ernest C. Warde
Andy Warhol
Alan Wareing
Alex van Warmerdam
David Warren
Harold P. Warren
Norman J. Warren
Denzel Washington
Darrell Wasyk
John Waters
Mark Waters
Peter Watkins
Jon Watts
Ric Roman Waugh
Michael Waxman
Keenen Ivory Wayans
Carl Weathers
Sean Weathers
Kenneth Webb
Marc Webb
Millard Webb
Lois Weber
Chris Wedge
Apichatpong Weerasethakul
Peter Weibel
Paul Weiland
Ed. Weinberger
Clay Weiner
Hans Weingartner
Bob Weinstein
Harvey Weinstein
Peter Weir
Don Weis
Sam Weisman
D. B. Weiss
Glenn Weiss
Helmut Weiss
Adam Weissman
Chris Weitz
Paul Weitz
Bo Welch
Orson Welles
Arthur Wellin
William Wellman
Simon Wells
Wim Wenders
Alfred L. Werker
Lina Wertmüller
Roland West
Simon West
Ti West
Tanya Wexler
James Whale
Frank Whaley
Leopold Wharton
Joyce Wieland
Leigh Whannell
Theodore Wharton
Ken and Jim Wheat
Joss Whedon
Tim Whelan
Dean White
Eddie White
Mike White
Susanna White
Ken Whittingham
Richard Whorf
Kanchi Wichmann
Bernhard Wicki
Robert B. Weide
Hans Weidemann
Bo Widerberg
Virgil Widrich
Ken Wiederhorn
Erin Wiedner
Robert Wiene
Crane Wilbur
Herbert Wilcox
Cornel Wilde
Olivia Wilde
Ted Wilde
Billy Wilder
Gene Wilder
W. Lee Wilder
Gordon Wiles
Diane Wilkins
Irvin Willat
Adim Williams
Chris Williams
Paul Andrew Williams
Richard Williams
Stephen Williams
Dennis Willis
Gordon Willis
Paul Wilmshurst
Rex Wilson
Scott Winant
Simon Wincer
Bretaigne Windust
Adam Wingard
Henry Winkler
Irwin Winkler
https://en.wikipedia.org/wiki/Max_Winkler_(director)|Max Winker]]
Michael Winner
David Winning
Michael Winterbottom
Tommy Wirkola
Frank Wisbar
Kirk Wise
Robert Wise
Tommy Wiseau
Frederick Wiseman
Len Wiseman
Doris Wishman
Chester Withey
William Witney
Alexander Witt
George C. Wolfe
Art Wolff
Jason Woliner
Andy Wolk
James Wong
Wong Jing
Wong Kar-wai
John Woo
Andrés Wood
Ed Wood
Ivor Wood
Sam Wood
Jeremy Wooding
Arthur B. Woods
Kate Woods
Stephen Woolfenden
John Griffith Wray
Edgar Wright
Joe Wright
Mack V. Wright
Julius Wu
Rupert Wyatt
William Wyler
Robert Wynne-Simmons
Jim Wynorski

Top of page

X
Xie Jin
Xie Fei
Top of page

Y

Boaz Yakin
Edward Yang
Ruby Yang
Jean Yarbrough
Tom Yasumi
David Yates
Hal Yates
Peter Yates
Reggie Yates
Irvin S. Yeaworth Jr.
Derek Yee
Ray Yeung
Özgür Yıldırım
Lev Yilmaz
Wayne Yip
Wilson Yip
Eugen York
Bud Yorkin
Yaky Yosha
Yamada Youji
Harold Young
James Young
Terence Young
Yuen Woo-ping
Brian Yuzna
Jake Yuzna
Yugander V. V.

Top of page

Z

Romas Zabarauskas
Jeremiah Zagar
Eduard Zahariev
Alex Zakrzewski
Jerry Zaks
Alex Zamm
Moisés Zamora
Rudy Zamora
Krzysztof Zanussi
Alan Zaslove
Kristi Zea
Dan Zeff
Franco Zeffirelli
Primo Zeglio
Sande Zeig
Alfred Zeisler
Benh Zeitlin
Florian Zeller
David Zellner
Frederic Zelnik
Robert Zemeckis
David Zennie
Hans H. Zerlett
Zhang Yang
Zhang Yimou
Zhang Yuan
Zheng Junli
Thierry Zéno
Chloé Zhao
Tian Zhuangzhuang
Maheen Zia
Howard Zieff
Želimir Žilnik
Lydia Zimmermann
Michael Zinberg
Fred Zinnemann
Thishiwe Ziqubu
Craig Zisk
Randy Zisk
Rob Zombie
Erick Zonca
Hisham Zreiq
Zucker Brothers
Steve Zuckerman
Ezz El-Dine Zulficar
Mahmoud Zulfikar
Edward Zwick
Joel Zwick
Terry Zwigoff
Andrzej Żuławski
Xawery Żuławski
Harald Zwart

Top of page

See also

 List of film director and cinematographer collaborations
 List of film director and composer collaborations
 List of Spaghetti Western directors

References

Television